SS Canberra was an ocean liner, which later operated on cruises, in the P&O fleet from 1961 to 1997. She was built at the Harland and Wolff shipyard in Belfast, Northern Ireland at a cost of £17 million. The ship was named on 17 March 1958, after the federal capital of Australia, Canberra. She was launched on 16 March 1960, sponsored by Dame Pattie Menzies, wife of the then Prime Minister of Australia, Robert Menzies. She entered service in May 1961, and made her maiden voyage starting in June. In the 1982 Falklands War she served as a troopship. In 1997 the singer and songwriter Gerard Kenny released the single "Farewell Canberra" which was specially composed for the last voyage.

History

Ocean liner
P&O commissioned Canberra to operate the combined P&O–Orient Line service between the United Kingdom and Australasia and designed her to carry 548 first-class passengers and 1,650 tourist class. Too big for Tilbury she was based at Southampton. Her first voyage set out on 2 June 1961 through the Suez Canal and called at Colombo, Fremantle, Melbourne, Sydney, Auckland, Suva, Honolulu, San Francisco and Los Angeles returning to Southampton by the same ports. By mid-1963 she had spent many months in dry dock in Southampton and in the builder's yard for repairs to her electrical and mechanical systems.

The era of mass air travel had begun by the time the Canberra was laid down and air travel prices fell relentlessly in the early 1960s to challenge P&O's lowest fares. In the second half of 1962 Canberra made a short cruise from Southampton followed by two more to New York. More cruises followed but nevertheless most of the ship's first decade was spent on the Australia run.

Cruises

At the end of 1972 she was withdrawn and refitted to carry 1,500 single-class passengers on cruises. Unusually, this transition from an early life as a purpose-built ocean liner to a long and successful career in cruising, occurred without any major external alterations, and with only minimal internal and mechanical changes over the years. One of her public rooms included a 'Cricketers Tavern', which contained a collection of bats and ties from cricket clubs all over the world; she also had the William Fawcett reading/writing room, named for the first P&O ship.

In 1961, while still a student at the Royal College in London, the now famous British artist David Hockney (born 1937) was commissioned to create a mural for the ‘Pop Inn’, a special lounge for teenagers onboard. Hockney graffitied and drew on the walls for five days and the fee earned assisted him to travel to New York for the first time.

Engineering
Like  and  that she replaced on the Tilbury–Brisbane route, Canberra had turbo-electric transmission. Instead of being mechanically coupled to her propeller shafts, Canberras steam turbines drove large electric alternators that provided current for electric motors that, in turn, drove the vessel's twin propellers. She also had a bow propeller for manoeuvring in port and docking manoeuvres. She was also the first British passenger liner to use alternating current as power.

There are several operational and economical advantages to such electrical de-coupling of a ship's propulsion system, and it became a standard element of cruise ship design in the 1990s, over 30 years after Canberra entered service. However, diesel engine- and gas turbine-driven alternators are the primary power source for most modern electrically propelled ships.

Canberra had a bulbous bow, two sets of stabilizers, and two funnels side-by-side. The lifeboats, which were made from glass fibre, were placed three decks lower than usual for ships of her type, and were recessed into the hull to allow improved view from the passenger decks.

Falklands War

On 2 April 1982, Argentina invaded the Falkland Islands, which initiated the Falklands War. At the time, Canberra was cruising in the Mediterranean. The next day, her captain Dennis Scott-Masson received a message asking his time of arrival at Gibraltar, which was not on his itinerary. When he called at Gibraltar, he learnt that the Ministry of Defence (MoD) had requisitioned Canberra for use as a troopship. Canberra sailed to Southampton, Hampshire where she was quickly refitted, sailing on 9 April for the South Atlantic.

Canberra was sent to the heart of the conflict.

Canberra anchored in San Carlos Water on 21 May as part of the landings by British forces to retake the islands. Although her size and white colour made her an unmissable target for the Argentine Air Force, Canberra, if sunk, would not have been completely submerged in the shallow waters at San Carlos. However, the liner was not badly hit in the landings as the Argentine pilots tended to attack the warships instead of the supply and troop ships. After the war, Argentine pilots said they were told not to hit Canberra, as they mistook her for a hospital ship. Hospital ships must be painted white, as Canberra always had been, but must also have a green stripe and fly a Red Cross flag.

Canberra then sailed to South Georgia, where 3,000 troops were transferred from Queen Elizabeth 2. They were landed at San Carlos on 2 June. When the war ended, Canberra was used as a cartel to repatriate captured Argentine soldiers, landing them at Puerto Madryn, before returning to Southampton to a rapturous welcome on 11 July. Captain Scott-Masson, who had started his apprenticeship on the Shaw, Savill & Albion Line troopship  in the late 1940s, was awarded a CBE and made an aide-de-camp to Queen Elizabeth II.

Final years

After a lengthy refit, Canberra returned to civilian service as a cruise ship. Her role in the Falklands War made her very popular with the British public, and ticket sales after her return were elevated for many years as a result. In March 1986, the Golden Cockerel trophy was transferred from the old Oriana to the Canberra due to Oriana's retirement. Age and high running costs eventually caught up with the Canberra though, as she had much higher fuel consumption than most modern cruise ships. As refitting her to meet the new 1997 SOLAS regulations would have been very expensive, P&O opted to retire the old vessel.

On 25 June 1996 P&O Cruises announced that the Canberra would be retired at the end of 1997. Although Premier Cruise Line had made a bid for the old ship, P&O had already decided that they did not want Canberra to operate under a different flag and refused to sell her to Premier (as a result, Premier bought the similar looking Rotterdam). A replacement for the Canberra, the 1988-built Star Princess was transferred to P&O Cruises and was renamed Arcadia. On 25 September 1997 the Golden Cockerel trophy was transferred from Canberra to the new Oriana while both ships were docked at Cannes, France.

Canberra was withdrawn from P&O service on 30 September 1997 and sold to ship breakers for scrapping on 10 October 1997, leaving for Gadani ship-breaking yard, Pakistan on 31 October 1997. Her deep draft meant that she could not be beached as far as most ships, and due to her solid construction the scrapping process took nearly a year instead of the estimated three months, being totally scrapped by the end of 1998.

Gallery

Media
An edition of The Rank Organisation film series Look at Life -  'Shape of a Ship'. Featured the SS Canberra whilst she was still being constructed. The program also described the changes in ship design that were being implemented at the time. 
British singer/songwriter John Paul Young emigrated to Sydney, NSW, Australia on this ship on Australia Day, 26 January 1962 at age 11.
SS Canberra is the liner where, in the James Bond film Diamonds Are Forever, Mr. Wint and Mr. Kidd try to kill Bond.
The singer/songwriter Gerard Kenny released "Farewell Canberra" in 1997, which was written especially for the last voyage and a tribute to SS Canberra. The song mentions the ship giving a home and comfort to the Falklands soldiers who were "so brave and alone" and that for the many people who traveled on Canberra, she remains "always in our memory" and "our wonderful home on the sea".
Part of the TV mini-series Melissa by Alan Bleasdale starring Tim Dutton, Jennifer Ehle, and Julie Walters was filmed on board during the ship's last voyage from Madeira.

Statistics
 Launched by Dame Pattie Menzies 16 March 1960
 Sailed from Belfast to Southampton 28 April 1961
 Entered P&O service 19 May 1961
 Fuel consumption; about 250–300 tonnes/day at sea
 Water consumption, engines; 200 tonnes/day
 Water consumption, domestic; 600 tonnes/day
 Water production capacity; 450 tonnes/day
 The top section of her radar mast was designed to cantilever astern to clear the Sydney Harbour Bridge

References

Footnotes

Works cited

Further reading

External links

 ssCanberra.com - a site dedicated to the Canberra 
 Great Ocean Liners: Canberra
 IWM Interview with Captain Dennis Scott-Masson

1960 ships
Falklands War naval ships of the United Kingdom
Ships built in Belfast
Ships of P&O Cruises
Ships of P&O (company)
Troop ships of the United Kingdom
Turbo-electric steamships
Ships built by Harland and Wolff
Maritime incidents in 1973
Maritime history of Australia